Dowding is an English surname of Old English origin. Notable people with this surname include the following:

 Bruce Dowding, Australian spy for Britain
 Geoffrey Dowding, typographer, author of Finer Points in the Spacing & Arrangement of Type
 Hugh Dowding, 1st Baron Dowding, Royal Air Force commander during World War II
 Keith Dowding, professor of political science at the London School of Economics
 Keith Dowding (activist), Australian Presbyterian minister
 Leilani Dowding, British glamour model
 Muriel Dowding, Baroness Dowding, wife of Hugh Dowding; English animal rights campaigner
 Peter Dowding, former Australian politician and premier of Western Australia

References 

English-language surnames
Surnames of Old English origin